Charlton Atlee Hammaker (born January 24, 1958) is a former Major League Baseball left-handed pitcher who played the majority of his career for the San Francisco Giants (1982–1990). He also played for the Kansas City Royals, San Diego Padres, and Chicago White Sox. During his twelve-year career, he won 59 games, lost 67 games and netted five saves.

Early life
Hammaker was born in Carmel, California, on January 24, 1958, the son of Miyake and Charles Hammaker. A middle child; he has one older brother, Aldine and one younger sister, Charlene. He is half German and half Japanese. Hammaker grew up living in many different locations due to his father's career in the United States Army, and attended Mount Vernon High School in Fairfax County, Virginia, where he played basketball, football, and baseball. After suffering a knee injury in football his sophomore year, he began focusing on basketball.

Hammaker received a full basketball scholarship to East Tennessee State University (ETSU) in Johnson City. After being talked to and convinced by the coaches at ETSU, Hammaker decided to change his focus to baseball. He attended a summer league in Alaska, and from there, was a first round pick (21st overall) in the 1979 MLB Draft by the Kansas City Royals.

Career
In 1983, Hammaker's best season, he led the National League with an ERA of 2.25, a WHIP of 1.039, BB/9IP  of 1.67, and strikeout to walk ratio of 3.97. That year Hammaker won 10, lost 9, and made the National League All-Star team. (Through June, his record was 9–3 with an ERA of 1.52.)

1983 All-Star Game
Hammaker made the National League All-Star team in 1983, but did not fare well, surrendering seven earned runs in 0.2 inning pitched; and he gave up the only grand slam in All-Star Game history, to Fred Lynn. The American League prevailed 13–3 for their first win in twelve years.

1987 NLCS
In Game 7 of the 1987 NLCS, Hammaker, pitching for San Francisco, gave up a three-run homer in the second inning to José Oquendo, a utility infielder who had hit only one home run that season. The Cardinals won 6–0 to advance to the World Series.

Religion
While with the Giants, Hammaker and teammates Scott Garrelts, Dave Dravecky and Jeff Brantley became known as the "God Squad" because of their strong Christian faith. Forgoing the hard-partying lifestyle of many of their teammates, they preferred to hold Bible studies in their hotel rooms while on the road.

Personal life
Hammaker is married and lives in Knoxville, Tennessee, with his wife. He is the father of five daughters. His second daughter, Jenna, is married to major league player Yan Gomes. His youngest daughter, Annalee, is married to minor league player Josh Rolette, a catcher in the Cleveland Indians' farm system.

See also
 List of Major League Baseball annual ERA leaders

References

External links
  
 1983 All Star Game box score

1958 births
American baseball players of Japanese descent
Baseball players from California
Birmingham Barons players
Chicago White Sox players
East Tennessee State Buccaneers baseball players
East Tennessee State Buccaneers men's basketball players
Fort Myers Royals players
Gulf Coast Royals players
High Desert Mavericks players
Jacksonville Suns players
Kansas City Royals players
Las Vegas Stars (baseball) players
Living people
Major League Baseball pitchers
Nashville Sounds players
National League All-Stars
National League ERA champions
Omaha Royals players
People from Carmel-by-the-Sea, California
Phoenix Firebirds players
Phoenix Giants players
San Diego Padres players
San Francisco Giants players
Shreveport Captains players
Wichita Wranglers players
American men's basketball players
Peninsula Oilers players